Henry O'Kane (born 5 April 2002) is a Ireland international rugby league footballer who plays as a  forward.

He was previously contracted to the Wests Tigers in the NRL.

Background
O’Kane was born in Sydney, New South Wales, Australia. He is of Irish descent.

Playing career

Club career
O’Kane played for the Balmain Tigers.

He played for the Western Suburbs Magpies in the 2022 NSW Cup.

International career
In 2022 O’Kane was named in the Ireland squad for the 2021 Rugby League World Cup.

References

External links
Western Suburbs Magpies profile
Wests Tigers profile
Ireland profile

2002 births
Living people
Balmain Tigers players
Ireland national rugby league team players
Australian rugby league players
Australian people of Irish descent
Rugby league players from Sydney
Rugby league second-rows
Western Suburbs Magpies NSW Cup players
Wests Tigers players